The Washington State Employment Security Department is a government agency for the U.S. state of Washington that is tasked with management of the unemployment system. It was established by the Washington State Legislature in 1947, replacing an earlier system. The department has been led by commissioner Suzan G. LeVine, who was formerly U.S. Ambassador to Switzerland and Liechtenstein, since 2018.

During the COVID-19 pandemic in 2020, the state unemployment system was the target of an international fraud scheme from Nigeria that cost over $650 million in losses. The system had processed claims for 30.8 percent of civilian workers in Washington, the highest of any state in the United States. The fraud ring, named Scattered Canary by security researchers, had also filed fraudulent unemployment claims in six other states and is under investigation from the U.S. Department of Justice. By early June, the state government had recovered $333 million out of the $650 million lost to the fraud scheme. The ESD had also implemented stricter reviews for unemployment claims that were later rolled back. In August, the ESD announced that benefits for 86,449 fraudulent accounts totaling $576 million had been paid out, of which $340 million had been recovered.

The ESD's trust fund originally held $4.7 billion in March 2020, but was reduced to $2.8 billion within three months and is expected to be depleted by 2021.

References

External links
 

Employment Security
Unemployment in the United States